Agate is an unincorporated community in southeastern Rolette and western Towner counties in the U.S. state of North Dakota.  It lies along North Dakota Highway 66, south of Rolla and northwest of Cando, the respective seats of Rolette and Towner Counties.  Its elevation is 1,657 feet (505 m), and it is located at  (48.6227795, -99.4931974).  Agate has the ZIP code 58310.

History
Agate was laid out in 1906. A post office was established at Agate in 1907, and remained in operation until it was discontinued in 1964. The community was named for local deposits of agate.

References

Unincorporated communities in Rolette County, North Dakota
Unincorporated communities in Towner County, North Dakota
Unincorporated communities in North Dakota
Populated places established in 1906
1906 establishments in North Dakota